Rebel News (also known as The Rebel Media and The Rebel) is a Canadian far-right political and social commentary media website operated by Rebel News Network Ltd. It has been described as a "global platform" for the anti-Muslim ideology known as counter-jihad. It was founded in February 2015 by former Sun News Network personalities Ezra Levant and Brian Lilley.

Rebel News broadcasts its content only on the internet and has been called Canada's version of Breitbart News. Rebel News has been described as being part of the alt-right movement.

Former Sun News reporter Faith Goldy joined Rebel News after its launch, but was fired for her coverage of the 2017 Charlottesville rally and for conducting an interview with The Daily Stormer. A co-founder and two freelancers resigned in protest of the coverage. Gavin McInnes, founder of the far-right neo-fascist organization Proud Boys, was a contributor. McInnes departed in 2017, then temporarily rejoined the site for a period in 2019. In the midst of the 2021 Canadian federal election, Justin Trudeau accused Rebel News of spreading misinformation, especially with regards to COVID-19 vaccines. Rebel News has promoted climate change denial and oil sands extraction in Alberta.

History 
Prior to the official opening of the media franchise operation as a corporation, it operated for a number of years as an individual effort of Levant's who styled himself "The Rebel." At least one of his ideas, to fight "anti-Christian bigots on Nanaimo city council," attracted support from university student and now Member of Parliament Dane Lloyd.

2015–2017 

 
The Rebel Media was formed by Levant and Lilley following the closure of the Sun News Network. Levant said that his online production would be unencumbered by the regulatory and distribution difficulties faced by Sun News Network and that its lower production costs would make it more viable. Levant has cited Breitbart News, the American far-right news website, as an inspiration. The site soon attracted a number of other former Sun News Network personalities such as David Menzies, Paige MacPherson, Faith Goldy, Patrick Moore and, briefly, Michael Coren.

In the summer of 2015, the channel, led by Levant, launched a campaign to boycott Tim Hortons, a chain of Canadian coffee shops, after it rejected in-store ads from Enbridge due to complaints from customers opposed to the oil pipeline projects being promoted by the ads.

In early 2016, the Alberta government banned The Rebel Media's correspondents from press briefings on the grounds that, because Ezra Levant had testified in court in 2014 that he was a columnist or commentator rather than a reporter, none of his current correspondents could be considered to be journalists. On 17 February 2016, the government admitted that it made a mistake and said that it would allow The Rebel Media correspondents into press briefings. The Canadian Association of Journalists supported preventing government from choosing journalism coverage."

In late 2016, after first being refused press accreditation for the United Nations Framework Convention on Climate Change (UNFCC) COP22 Climate Change Conference, Rebel Media was allowed to send two correspondents to COP22. Levant wrote that "We're not being excluded because we have an opinion. We're being excluded because we have the wrong opinion." 
Rebel Media received support from the Environment Minister Catherine McKenna and three journalism organizations in getting the UNFCC to grant this access, after Levant's October 17 appeal to Justin Trudeau.

Following the Quebec City mosque shooting on 29 January 2017, Rebel promoted a conspiracy theory that the shooting was perpetrated by Muslims. In 2017, Rebel Media hired far-right activist Tommy Robinson, founder of the avowedly anti-Islamic English Defence League, as its British correspondent. Robinson was convicted of mortgage fraud and using a friend's passport to enter the US.

In March 2017, one of their correspondents, Gavin McInnes, made controversial comments defending Holocaust deniers, accused the Jews of being responsible for the Holodomor and the Treaty of Versailles, and said he was "becoming anti-Semitic". He later said his comments were taken out of context. McInnes also produced a satirical video for Rebel called "Ten Things I Hate about Jews", later retitled "Ten Things I Hate About Israel".

During the 2017 French Presidential Election, Jack Posobiec, The Rebel Media's Washington, D.C. bureau chief, supported far-right leader Marine Le Pen and played a role in the 2017 Macron e-mail leaks.

Blowback over coverage of the Unite the Right Rally 
On 12 August 2022, Rebel correspondent Faith Goldy reported from the Unite the Right Rally in Charlottesville, Virginia. Broadcasting on livestream, she gained clear footage of a fatal car attack by a white supremacist against left-wing protestors. Interviewed about the rally and the clip by Israel’s Channel 2 News, Goldy opined that, "there is a "culture war" happening between the hard left and hard right and that "many on both sides see this as a civil war – you know the fascists vs. the communists."

On Monday August 14, Rebel founder Ezra Levant denounced the element of the "alt-right" which had participated in the rally, stating that it "now effectively means racism, anti-Semitism and tolerance of neo-Nazism."
The same day Brian Lilley announced his departure from Rebel News, writing, "What anyone from The Rebel was doing at a so-called 'unite the right' rally that was really an anti-Semitic white power rally is beyond me. Especially not a rally dedicated to keeping up a statue of Robert E. Lee, a man that whatever else he stood for, also fought on the wrong side of history and the wrong side of America’s bloodiest conflict." Lilley said he had become uncomfortable with what he felt was an "increasingly harsh tone" when The Rebel discussed topics such as immigration or Islam. He accused The Rebel of exhibiting a "lack of editorial and behavioural judgment that left unchecked will destroy it and those around it."

Less than a week after the rally, on August 17 Levant fired Goldy from Rebel News when it had emerged that she’d joined a podcast produced by The Daily Stormer in which she appeared to support the rally’s right-wing participants. In the course of reporting on the Unite the Right rally, Goldy argued that they suggested a wider "rising white racial consciousness" in America and characterizing a manifesto by white supremacist Richard Spencer that called for organizing states along racial lines as "robust" and "well thought-out."

Freelancers Barbara Kay and John Robson also quit the Rebel, and the company was denounced by Conservative MP Michael Chong, Chris Alexander, Peter Kent, Lisa Raitt, and former interim leader Rona Ambrose had previously disavowed the site.

Brian Jean, Jason Kenney, and Doug Schweitzer of the United Conservative Party of Alberta condemned the Rebel and said they would not grant interviews to the company. Jean dropped his boycott of the Rebel in August 2022 and agreed to an interview about his leadership campaign for the United Conservative Party.

Gavin McInnes left the Rebel at the end of August 2017. Levant wrote "We tried to keep him, but he was lured away by a major competitor that we just couldn’t outbid" in an email to the independent news site Canadaland. In February 2019, after suing the Southern Poverty Law Center for allegedly damaging his reputation and career prospect by characterizing the Proud Boys as a hate group, McInnes announced that he had once again been hired by the media group.

British contributor Caolan Robertson no longer works for the Rebel. Robertson claims he was fired for "knowing too much" about the Rebel's finances, claiming the company dishonestly solicited donations for projects that were already funded and concealing how that money was spent. He also claimed that Southern was fired for refusing to tape a fundraising appeal for the Rebel's Israel trip after fundraising targets had already been met. Robertson also played audio of Levant offering him thousands of dollars of what Levant himself called "hush money." Levant denies these allegations and says he will present evidence opposing this in court, claiming that he was being "blackmailed" by Robertson and his partner. Levant has since briefly talked about The Rebel's finances in his online show and released a summary on The Rebel's website. It was reported that person that negotiated the settlement is the former director of communication for Prime Minister Stephen Harper, Kory Teneycke.

Boycott by the Conservative Party of Canada 

During the 2017 Conservative Party leadership race, many contenders, including the eventual leadership winner Andrew Scheer, gave interviews to the outlet.

After the 2017 Conservative Party leadership race, it was revealed that Scheer's campaign manager Hamish Marshall's IT firm Torch provided IT services to The Rebel Media. In 2015, Marshall told the National Observer that he was only involved in the business side of the Rebel. Marshall explained to that he had left the Rebel after the leadership race ended to avoid a conflict of interest. In September 2017, Marshall's name was removed from the list of directors of The Rebel Media on the federal government's online registry of corporate information. On 16 October 2017, The Globe and Mail asked Scheer if he knew that Hamish Marshall shared office space with the Rebel during the leadership campaign. Scheer replied that he did not ask Marshall about his firm's many clients. Later, a spokesperson clarified that Scheer did not know the specifics of the arrangement. Levant explained that Marshall's IT firm Torch provided client services for the Rebel. A 2017 National Post article argued that Marshall implemented the Rebel donation system. Scheer told Maclean's in 2018 that Marshall's past relationship with the Rebel should not be conflated with his selection as campaign chair.

Scheer denounced the outlet due to its coverage of the Unite the Right rally, and stated that he would stop doing interviews with The Rebel Media until its "editorial directions" changed. A day later, Scheer stated that he would not be granting interviews with the Rebel going forward, in an interview with the National Post.

On September 30, 2019, two police forces escorted Rebel Media correspondent David Menzies away from a Scheer campaign announcement.

Advertiser boycott 

Beginning in May 2017, the Rebel was the target of a boycott campaign by the social media activist group Sleeping Giants whereby advertisers were pressured to withdraw their adverts from The Rebel Media's YouTube channel and website. Within a three-month period in 2017, the activist group claimed that the Rebel had lost approximately 300 advertisers, including CCM Hockey, Mountain Equipment Co-op, Red Lobster, Reitmans, Penguin Books Canada, Volkswagen Canada and Tangerine Bank, along with PetSmart, the Hudson's Bay Company, General Motors Canada, the Royal Canadian Mint, the Nova Scotia Liquor Corporation, Ottawa Tourism, Porter Airlines, and Whistler Blackcomb ski resort.

The City of Edmonton withdrew from city advertisements after complaints on social media about the controversial nature of Levant's comments. According to Councilor Oshry, the city would have made this decision regardless of political leanings, because of controversial articles.

Another activist group, Hope not Hate, pressured Norwegian Cruise Lines into cancelling a scheduled Caribbean cruise which was to feature talks by The Rebel Media personalities, many of whom have since left the media website.

Rebel Freedom Fund 

In December 2017 Wells Asset Management announced the Rebel Freedom Fund, allowing investors to fund Levant's film and video projects, offering an expected 4.5% return. This attracted news coverage the following February in advance of the fund's ostensible 1 March opening date, generally negative; MoneySense, for example, stated that "This one carries a lot of risk and doesn’t clear the MoneySense bar for appropriate retirement investment risk, whatever the political orientation." In June, however, Wells announced that it was shutting down all its funds, and when queried by a reporter from Maclean's, stated that the Rebel Freedom Fund had never launched.

2019 Canadian federal election 

The writs of election for the 2019 Canadian federal election were issued by Governor General Julie Payette on September 11, 2019, and the 2019 Canadian federal election was held on October 21, 2019. The leadership debates were held on 7 October in English and 10 October in French.

On September 30, 2019, two police forces escorted Rebel Media correspondent David Menzies away from a Scheer campaign announcement.

In twin lawsuits both filed during the morning of 7 October, Menzies and another journalist at Rebel News and Andrew James Lawton of True North Centre for Public Policy applied for judicial relief related "to identical decisions made by the Leaders' Debates Commission. The Commission [had] denied accreditation" for the Leaders’ Debates to the journalists. In a stinging rebuke to the Commission, Justice Russel Zinn found that afternoon that "the Applicants have proven on the balance of probabilities that they will suffer irreparable harm if the requested Order is not granted" and thus Zinn ordered that the journalist-Applicants be accorded the same rights as the legacy media. The journalists were allowed equitable access to the media scrum that evening of 7 October after the debate.

2021 Canadian federal election 

During the 2021 Canadian federal election, the Leaders' Debates Commission, which was at the time chaired by former Governor-General David Johnston, again disallowed members of Rebel News from receiving accreditation to the French and English language debates. Ahead of the French language debate, an expedited ruling by Justice Elizabeth Heneghan allowed 11 members of Rebel News to attend the two debates to ask questions. Levant, whose organization had accused the commission of being "capricious, unfair, unlawful and arbitrary in denying its journalists the right to fully cover the debate" said "Today we scored one for liberty."

Justice Heneghan published her ratio decidendi in case number T-1364-21 on 7 March 2022, and wrote that "In my opinion, the Applicant established irreparable harm in terms of being prevented from participation in the political process, on behalf of the electorate. There is room in the nation for the expression of opposing points of view. The Applicant did not ask to impose its views, but for the opportunity to participate in coverage of matters of importance during a federal election."

When asked a question by Rebel News following the French debate, Prime Minister Justin Trudeau attacked the organization for spreading misinformation, especially with regards to COVID-19 vaccines and refused to "call it a media organization". The clip of the interaction went viral. NDP leader Jagmeet Singh and Bloc Québécois leader Yves-François Blanchet refused to speak to Rebel News.

Climate change denialist views 
Levant has used Rebel Media to promote climate change denial and advocate the interests of the oil sands extraction industry in Alberta. In an article for Canada's National Observer, Max Fawcett mentioned Rebel Media as one of the groups who undermine "the scientific consensus around climate change and vaccines".

Former contributors 

 Tanveer Ahmed
 Janice Atkinson – former Member of European Parliament
 Jack Buckby
 Michael Coren
 Éric Duhaime
 Faith Goldy
 Sebastian Gorka
 Katie Hopkins
 Barbara Kay
 Mark Latham – former leader of Australian Labor Party
 Claire Lehmann – founder/editor of Quillette
 Brian Lilley
 Laura Loomer
 Gavin McInnes
 Jack Posobiec
 Tommy Robinson
 Lauren Southern

See also 

 Western Standard
 Jihad Watch	
 The Brussels Journal

References

External links 

2015 establishments in Ontario
Alt-right websites
Anti-Islam sentiment in Canada
Canadian news websites
Canadian podcasters
Canadian political websites
Companies based in Toronto
Conservative magazines published in Canada
Conspiracist media
Counter-jihad
Far-right politics in Canada
Internet properties established in 2015
Internet television channels
Islamophobic publications
Magazines established in 2015
Magazines published in Toronto
Podcasting companies
Vaccine hesitancy
Video on demand services
YouTube channels
2019 in Canadian case law
2021 in Canadian case law
Canadian judicial review case law
Climate change denial